Nabih Berri (born 28 January 1938) is a Lebanese Shia politician who has been serving as Speaker of the Parliament of Lebanon since 1992. He heads the Amal Movement.

Early life and education
He was born in Bo, Sierra Leone to Lebanese Shia parents on 28 January 1938. His father, Mustafa Berri, was a trader there.

Berri went to school in Tebnine and Ain Ebel in southern Lebanon, then continued his education in Bint Jbeil and Jaafariya supplementary schools in southern Lebanon  and later studied at the Makassed and the Ecole de la Sagesse in Beirut. He graduated with a law degree from the Lebanese University in 1963, where he had served as the student body president, and became a lawyer at the Court of Appeals.

Early career
During 1963, Berri was elected as president of the National Union of Lebanese Students, and participated to student and political conferences. During his early career he became a lawyer at the Court of Appeals. In the early 1970s, Berri worked in Beirut as a lawyer for several companies.

Lebanese Civil War 
In 1980, Berri was elected leader of the Amal Movement, and led the resistance against the Israeli army especially in the south of Lebanon and Beqaa and the most famous battle was the battle of khalde in 1982.

He was the key player of the Intifada of 6 February 1984 with his ally Walid Jumblatt leader of the Progressive Socialist Party against the Lebanese sectarian government of Amin Gemayel, where officers and soldiers were called to defect from the Lebanese Army and made ground for the Taif agreement that ended the civil war.

Berri also joined the National Unity government as minister of state for South Lebanon and reconstruction under Prime Minister Rashid Karami in May 1984. He also served as the minister of housing and co-operatives.

Political career
Berri served as a cabinet minister from 1984 to 1992:
 30 April 1984 to 22 September 1988: Minister of Justice in the government of Rashid Karami.
 25 November 1989 to 24 December 1990: Minister of Hydraulic & Electric Resources in the government of Selim Hoss.
 25 November 1989 to 24 December 1990: Minister of Housing & Cooperatives in the government of Selim Hoss.
 16 May 1992 to 31 October 1992: Minister of state in the government of Rachid Solh.

Due to strong Syrian backing and to Berri's proximity to Syrian officials in Lebanon, he was reported to have the biggest influence in the Lebanese government formed after the Taif Accord.

Berri headed the list of "Liberation" in the parliamentary elections that took place in southern Lebanon on 6 September 1992, which was won in full. The other lists he headed were "Liberation and Development" in the parliamentary elections on 8 September 1996, which was won in full. Since 1992 he has chaired the Liberation and Development parliamentary bloc.

Berri headed the list of "Resistance and Development" in the parliamentary elections that took place in southern Lebanon on 3 September 2000, which was won in full. He also headed the list of Liberation and Development in the parliamentary elections which took place in June 2005, which was won in full. Currently, Berri heads the list of "Liberation and Development" in the parliamentary elections on 7 June 2009. All the members of the Bloc won the elections in 2009.

Speaker Nabih Berri was always and is still a major supporter of the dialogue between all Lebanese parties, religions and sects. During the last national dialogue session in May 2014, Speaker Nabih Berri stressed that "power-sharing between Christians and Muslims in Lebanon would not change under any circumstance," adding that he spoke on behalf of the Shia, Sunnis and the Druze.

He was elected Speaker of the parliament of Lebanon for the first time on 20 October 1992 (105 votes out of 124 votes). He was re-elected for a second time on 22 October 1996 (122 votes out of 126 votes). He was elected to the same post on 17 October 2000 unanimously (124 votes out of 126 votes), on 28 June 2005 (90 votes out of 126 votes), on 25 June 2009 (90 votes out of 127 votes), and on 23 May 2018 (98 votes out of 128 votes).

Since 1999, he has chaired the Arab Parliament Committee in charge of disclosing Israeli crimes against Arab civilians. On 3 June 2003, he was elected president of the Arab Parliament and handed the presidency in Damascus on 1 March 2004 for a period of two years. He was elected president of the Council of the Parliamentary Union of the Member States.

On 9 March 2004, Nabih Berri was elected President of the Parliamentary Union of the OIC Member States in Dakar-Senegal until 9 March 2006.

In 2013 and 2014 he supported the UCC, the teachers, public employees, and the armed forces in Lebanon, in their fight to increase their salaries, and has held many meeting with political leaders in an effort to attain his goal.

Since 1993, Berri has chaired the Union of Parliamentarians of Lebanese Descent, including 156 members of parliament and senators from 19 countries.

Personal life
Berri has married twice and he has six children with Lila, his first wife, and four with his second wife, Randa Assi Berri.

Electoral history

1992

1996

2000

2005

2009

2018

References

External links

1938 births
Amal Movement politicians
Lebanese University alumni
Lebanese Shia Muslims
Lebanese expatriates in the United States
Living people
People from South Lebanon
Speakers of the Parliament of Lebanon
Sierra Leonean people of Lebanese descent
Sierra Leonean emigrants to Lebanon
21st-century Lebanese politicians